Gabriel Amavizca Ortiz (born January 11, 1993) is a Mexican professional gridiron football placekicker who is currently a free agent. He played college football at UDLAP, Universidad Madero and BUAP. Amavizca was also part of the Artilleros de Puebla of the Liga de Fútbol Americano Profesional (LFA), a professional spring football league in Mexico.

In June 2019, Amavizca became the first CFL global player ever to score points in a regular season match.

Early years
Amavizca was born in Hermosillo, Sonora, but moved to Puebla when he was eight years old. He started playing gridiron football at the age of 11, after practicing other sports such as baseball, tennis and association football. In high school, he received a scholarship to play football at the ITESM Puebla.

College career
Amavizca first enrolled in the UDLAP's college football program, the Aztecas, where he played for the 2013 season and won the CONADEIP championship. In 2014, he played for the Universidad Madero Tigres Blancos (White Tigers). After retiring for one season due to personal motives, he came back and played his last two college years for the BUAP, where he also earned a major in Business Administration.

Professional career
Amavizca played for the Artilleros de Puebla of the Liga de Fútbol Americano Profesional for the 2019 season He became the first Artilleros player to score points.

He was selected by the Winnipeg Blue Bombers at the 2019 CFL-LFA Draft as the team's third pick (26th overall). Amavizca attended the training camp with the Blue Bombers, but was released by the team on June 8, 2019 during the pre-season. Three days later, on June 11, he was signed by the Hamilton Tiger-Cats.

On June 22, 2019, Amavizca became the first global player to score points in a CFL regular season game kicking two converts during his team's 64–14 win over the Toronto Argonauts. He dressed in the first seven games of the season before being placed on the team's practice roster. He ended the 2019 season on the practice roster and was released at the end of the year.

In December 2021, Amavizca signed with the Reyes de Jalisco ahead of the 2022 LFA season.

References

External links
 Hamilton Tiger-Cats profile

Living people
1993 births
Sportspeople from Hermosillo
Mexican players of American football
Mexican players of Canadian football
American football placekickers
Artilleros de Puebla players
Hamilton Tiger-Cats players
Reyes de Jalisco players
Mexican expatriate sportspeople in Canada
Canadian football placekickers
Expatriate players of American football
Aztecas UDLAP players
Lobos BUAP (American football) players